Mark Mkongho O'Ojong (born April 25, 1997) is a Cameroonian footballer who plays as a left winger for Bamboutos FC.

Career
O'Ojong began his career in 2015 with Rainbow Bamenda, where he played for one season.  Since March 2015, O'Ojong plays for Seattle Sounders FC 2. He signed with USL side San Antonio FC on 28 April 2017.

In October 2019, O'Ojong joined Bamboutos FC in Cameroon.

References

1997 births
Living people
Cameroonian footballers
Association football midfielders
Rainbow FC (Cameroon) players
Tacoma Defiance players
San Antonio FC players
USL Championship players
Cameroon international footballers
Cameroonian expatriate sportspeople in Vietnam
Cameroonian expatriate sportspeople in the United States
Cameroonian expatriate sportspeople in Tunisia
Expatriate soccer players in the United States
Cameroonian expatriate footballers
Expatriate footballers in Tunisia
Expatriate footballers in Vietnam
2016 African Nations Championship players
Cameroon A' international footballers